The Telfer Mine is a gold, copper and silver mine located at Telfer on the land of the Martu people, in the Great Sandy Desert of Western Australia. It is owned by Newcrest Mining, the largest gold producer listed on the Australian Securities Exchange.

The mine was discovered by Newmont in 1972. However, Jean-Paul Turcaud, a French prospector, disputes this claim to this day.

Telfer is one of two gold mines Newcrest currently operates in Australia, the other being Cadia in New South Wales.

History

Discovery
Newmont first made a claim to the deposit in 1972. However this claim is disputed by Jean-Paul Turcaud to this date. Turcaud claims he found the Telfer deposit two years before Newcrest did. In the early 1980s, Turcaud reached a settlement, accepting $25,000 from Newmont's head office in New York City but continued his claim, demanding a Royal Commission.

The official story of the discovery states that the deposit was found by Day Dawn Minerals, a small exploration company, who did not stake a claim either. One of the company's geologists, a man called Ronnie Thomson, then moved on to work for Newmont, in which position he informed David Tyrwhitt, then exploration manager for the company in Western Australia, about the promising gold samples that had been found. Newmont paid Day Dawn $15,000 for the maps of the deposit and Tyrwhitt staked out the claim in May 1972.

First mining period 1977 to 2000
The mine opened in 1977 as a joint venture between BHP and Newmont. In 1990, a merger between BHP Gold and Newmont resulted in the creation of Newcrest, with ownership of the Telfer Mine now lying with Newcrest. In 1997, the mine reached the milestone of having produced  of gold. Open cut mining was suspended in August 2000 due to high operating costs. The closure of the mine came one year ahead of schedule as production of underground ore was well below mill capacity and therefore not viable. High production costs were primarily caused by the presence of cyanide soluble copper in the open pit ore. Newcrest then focused on exploratory drilling for new minerals.

Second mining period from 2002
The redevelopment expanded underground mining areas, deepened open pits, constructed a processing plant and power station, and built a new gas supply line from Port Hedland. The Telfer mine is not connected to the Western Australian power grid but instead produces its own power from natural gas via a  purpose built pipeline. The power station on site is able to produce 138 MW of power. The focus changed from open pit mining to underground mining, and Telfer became one of Australia's largest gold mines, second only to Kalgoorlie's Super Pit until Boddington Gold Mine reopened in 2009.

The mine reopened in November 2004, after commissioning of the processing plant and, initially as an open cut mine, from March 2006 also with an underground operation.

In January 2008, Newcrest Mining lowered the mine's annual gold output targets. Newcrest said, "At Telfer, mechanical availability of the open pit mining fleet and the processing of harder ores are impacting the expected production profile for the full year. Telfer site cash costs are expected to [rise] over guidance by 8-9 per cent." In June, the mine was affected by the statewide gas crisis caused by an explosion at Varanus Island. The mine lost  of gold output for June. Newcrest obtained interim gas supply from Woodside Petroleum until August, when gas supply from Varanus Island resumed.

Newcrest was forced to cut job numbers from 1,400 to around 1,000 in late 2008, during the financial crises, to reduce costs.

Mining is carried out at the Main Dome open pit and the underground operations below. The West Dome pit is being mined again.

On 4 December 2013 a contractor was killed at the mine, being crushed by pipe work.

Production
Production figures for the mine:

Gold
Annual gold production of the mine:

Copper
Annual copper production of the mine:

References

Bibliography

External links
 
 MINEDEX website: Telfer / Newcrest Database of the Department of Mines, Industry Regulation and Safety

1977 establishments in Australia
Copper mines in Western Australia
Gold mines in Western Australia
Great Sandy Desert
Open-pit mines
Shire of East Pilbara
Silver mines in Western Australia
Surface mines in Australia
Underground mines in Australia